Corres is a surname. Notable people with the surname include:

 Anne Fernández de Corres (born 1998), Spanish rugby union and rugby union player
 Celia Corres (born 1964), Spanish field hockey player
 Yulema Corres (born 1992), Spanish football forward

See also
 Korres (disambiguation)